This is a following list of the MTV Movie Award winners and nominees for Best Comedic Performance. The award was not given in the 2013 ceremony.

Winners and nominees

1990s

2000s

2010s

2020s

References

MTV Movie & TV Awards